Zbigniew Mikołajów (born 11 February 1953) is a Polish footballer. He played in three matches for the Poland national football team in 1980.

References

External links
 

1953 births
Living people
Polish footballers
Poland international footballers
Place of birth missing (living people)
Association footballers not categorized by position